The B-32 is an American racing sailboat, that was designed by Leif Beiley and first built in 1995.

Production
The boat was built by B Boats in the United States, who constructed just 14 examples, starting in 1995, before production ceased. The B-32 was recognized as the Best PHRF/Sportboat of the year for 1996 by Sailing World.

Design

Designer Leif Beiley described the boat's design goals, "I designed the B32 back in 1995 as a development of the B25, which we had a lot of success with. It was designed to excel in the conditions we usually have in southern California: 8-15 knot winds and ocean waves. We wanted a boat that wasn't extreme in any direction, just a good all-around performer that was affordable for people moving up from the smaller sportboats like the B25, Express 27, Moore 24, etc. Therefore we didn't use exotic materials in the structure or in the rig. The B32 won Sailing World's 1996 SportBoat Of The Year award and went on to have an illustrious record of wins in many major regattas. Twenty-five years on, B32's are still highly sought after and continue to win races."

The B-32 is a racing keelboat, built predominantly of fiberglass. It has a fractional sloop rig, an internally-mounted spade-type rudder and a fixed fin keel with a weight bulb. It displaces  and carries  of lead ballast.

The boat has a PHRF racing average handicap of 72 with a high of 84 and low of 66.

See also

List of sailing boat types

Similar sailboats
Beneteau 31
Beneteau Oceanis 321
Bayfield 30/32
C&C 32
C&C 99
Catalina 320
Contest 32 CS
Douglas 32
Hunter 32 Vision
Hunter 326
J/32
Mirage 32
Nonsuch 324
Ontario 32
Ranger 32

References

External links

Keelboats
1990s sailboat type designs
Sailing yachts
Sailboat type designs by Leif Beiley
Sailboat types built by B Boats